Veerabhadreswarar Temple is a Hindu temple located in the town of Kumbakonam in the Thanjavur district of Tamil Nadu, India.

Deities 

The presiding deity is the Agora Veerabhadra and the goddess is Bhadrakali.

Significance 

The temple faces west unlike most other Hindu temples. Ottakoothar wrote his seminal work Thakka Yaga Barani here.

References 

 

Hindu temples in Kumbakonam
Shiva temples in Thanjavur district